Niels Michael Aage Treschow (born April 22, 1943) is a Swedish businessman. As chairman of the board of both Unilever since 2007 and the Confederation of Swedish Enterprise, and former chairman of Ericsson, Treschow is one of the most influential people in Swedish business today.

Early life
Michael Treschow was born on April 22, 1943, in Helsingborg, Skåne län, Sweden. His father was a major in the Swedish Army.

Treschow graduated with a degree in engineering from Lund University.

Career
Treschow started his career at Atlas Copco, where he eventually became CEO. Later, he served as CEO of Electrolux. He is now chairman of Electrolux as well. In 2002 he became chairman at Ericsson. These positions were followed by his election at the Confederation of Swedish Enterprise, a lobbying organization for Sweden's larger companies. Treschow is also a board member at ABB.

Treschow serves as the chairman of Unilever. Additionally, he serves on the board of directors of ABB.

Treschow serves as the chairman of the board, Research Institute of Industrial Economics (IFN). He is a member of the Royal Swedish Academy of Engineering Sciences and a recipient of the Légion d'honneur.

Personal life
Treschow has been married twice and he has two children, Adam  Treschow and Adéle Treschow.

References

External links
 Resume at Ericsson's website

Living people
1943 births
People from Helsingborg
Swedish engineers
Swedish businesspeople
Unilever people
Ericsson people
Swedish Army officers